Mandjelia is a genus of South Pacific brushed trapdoor spiders first described by Robert Raven in 1994.

Species
 it contains twenty-three species:
Mandjelia anzses Raven & Churchill, 1994 – Australia (Queensland)
Mandjelia banksi Raven & Churchill, 1994 – Australia (Queensland)
Mandjelia brassi Raven & Churchill, 1994 (type) – Australia (Queensland)
Mandjelia colemani Raven & Churchill, 1994 – Australia (Queensland)
Mandjelia commoni Raven & Churchill, 1994 – Australia (Queensland)
Mandjelia exasperans Raven & Churchill, 1994 – Australia (Queensland)
Mandjelia fleckeri Raven & Churchill, 1994 – Australia (Queensland)
Mandjelia galmarra Raven & Churchill, 1994 – Australia (Queensland)
Mandjelia humphreysi Raven & Churchill, 1994 – Australia (Western Australia)
Mandjelia iwupataka Raven & Churchill, 1994 – Australia (Northern Territory)
Mandjelia macgregori Raven & Churchill, 1994 – Australia (Queensland)
Mandjelia madura Raven & Churchill, 1994 – Australia (Western Australia)
Mandjelia mccrackeni Raven & Churchill, 1994 – Australia (Queensland)
Mandjelia nuganuga Raven & Churchill, 1994 – Australia (Queensland)
Mandjelia oenpelli Raven & Churchill, 1994 – Australia (Northern Territory)
Mandjelia paluma Raven & Churchill, 1994 – Australia (Queensland)
Mandjelia platnicki Raven, 1994 – New Caledonia
Mandjelia qantas Raven & Churchill, 1994 – Australia (Queensland)
Mandjelia rejae Raven & Churchill, 1994 – Australia (Queensland)
Mandjelia thorelli (Raven, 1990) – Australia (Queensland)
Mandjelia wooroonooran Raven & Churchill, 1994 – Australia (Queensland)
Mandjelia wyandotte Raven & Churchill, 1994 – Australia (Queensland)
Mandjelia yuccabine Raven & Churchill, 1994 – Australia (Queensland)

References

Barychelidae
Mygalomorphae genera
Spiders of Australia